HMS Cygnet was a 14-gun ship-sloop of the Royal Navy's , launched on 24 January 1776.  She served during both the American Revolutionary War and the French Revolutionary War before being sold for disposal in 1802.

References
 
 Winfield, Rif, British Warships in the Age of Sail 1714-1792: Design, Construction, Careers and Fates. Seaforth Publishing, 2007. .

Cygnet (1776)
1776 ships
Swan-class ship-sloops